Kuwait competed at the 2014 Summer Youth Olympics, in Nanjing, China from 16 August to 28 August 2014.

Athletics

Kuwait qualified two athletes.

Qualification Legend: Q=Final A (medal); qB=Final B (non-medal); qC=Final C (non-medal); qD=Final D (non-medal); qE=Final E (non-medal)

Boys
Track & road events

Field Events

Fencing

Kuwait qualified one athlete based on its performance at the 2014 FIE Cadet World Championships.

Boys

Shooting

Kuwait was given a quota to compete by the tripartite committee.

Individual

Team

Swimming

Kuwait qualified one swimmer.

Boys

References

2014 in Kuwaiti sport
Nations at the 2014 Summer Youth Olympics
Kuwait at the Youth Olympics